Cannon Street station is a railway terminus and underground station in London.

Cannon Street station may also refer to:
Cannon Street Road railway station, a station of the London and Blackwall Railway in England
Hull Cannon Street railway station, a passenger terminus of the Hull and Barnsley Railway in England